Victor Wayne Travis was a Major League Baseball umpire who worked six American League games in 1995. His first game was on April 26, his last game was on May 2. He began his professional umpiring career in at least 1982.

Born: August 25, 1951 in Lexington, KY USA
Died: May 30, 2015 in Lexington, KY USA

References

Major League Baseball umpires
1951 births
2015 deaths